Glymmatophora, the Metallic Assassin Bugs, is a genus of assassin bugs belonging to the family Reduviidae.

Description
These medium-sized bugs are brightly metallic red or orange and bluish black or dark brown colored, an aposematic coloration. The females are wingless and are similar to the nymphs.

Members of this genus are known for hunting on diplopods giant African millipedes, by injecting them with a fast acting venom . They usually hide under leaf litter and sometimes boulders and prey at night.

Distribution
Species within this genus can be found throughout Southern Africa.

Species
Species within this genus include:

 Glymmatophora aeniceps  Horvath, 1914 
 Glymmatophora amazonica  Villiers, 1948 
 Glymmatophora angolana  Villiers, 1952 
 Glymmatophora angulata  Miller, 1956 
 Glymmatophora costalis  (Distant, 1903) 
 Glymmatophora crassipes  Horváth, 1914 
 Glymmatophora dejoncki  Schouteden, 1919 
 Glymmatophora dimorpha  (de Jonck, 1898) 
 Glymmatophora dubia  (Schouteden, 1909) 
 Glymmatophora eques  Breddin, 1913 
 Glymmatophora erythrodera  (Schaum, 1853) 
 Glymmatophora horvathi  Schouteden, 1931 
 Glymmatophora loangwae  Schouteden, 1919 
 Glymmatophora lomanicola  Villiers, 1971 
 Glymmatophora lotei  Villiers, 1948 
 Glymmatophora lundensis  Villiers, 1950 
 Glymmatophora machadoi  Villiers, 1950 
 Glymmatophora manicae  Miller, 1950 
 Glymmatophora mashonae  Miller, 1950 
 Glymmatophora nana  Miller, 1956 
 Glymmatophora natalensis  (Stål, 1855) 
 Glymmatophora overlaeti  Schouteden, 1931 
 Glymmatophora patricia  (Stål, 1855) 
 Glymmatophora pellax  Horvath, 1914 
 Glymmatophora rhodesiana  Miller, 1950 
 Glymmatophora rubripes  Stål, 1853 
 Glymmatophora rufipes  (de Jonck, 1898) 
 Glymmatophora schoutedeni  Horvath, 1906 
 Glymmatophora semirubra  Horvath, 1914 
 Glymmatophora sheffieldi  Schouteden, 1919 
 Glymmatophora submetallica  Stål, 1855 
 Glymmatophora sudanica  Schouteden, 1919 
 Glymmatophora swalei  Schouteden, 1919 
 Glymmatophora ugandana  Horvath, 1914 
 Glymmatophora venustiterga  Hesse, 1925 
 Glymmatophora viridescens  Miller, 1956

References

 Maldonado Capriles J. (1990): Catalogue of the Reduviidae of the World, Caribbean Journal of Science, University of Puerto Rico

External links
 Swedish Museum of Natural History

Reduviidae
Cimicomorpha genera
Insects of Africa